Athelopsis is a genus of corticioid fungi in the family Amylocorticiaceae. The widespread genus, estimated to contain 10 species, is polyphyletic as currently circumscribed.

Species
Athelopsis baculifera
Athelopsis bispora
Athelopsis colombiensis
Athelopsis galzinii
Athelopsis glaucina
Athelopsis gloeocystidiata
Athelopsis lacerata
Athelopsis lembospora
Athelopsis lunata
Athelopsis subinconspicua
Athelopsis virescens

References

External links

Amylocorticiales
Lichen genera